Lloyd Robert Shaw,  (February 7 1914 – October 16 1993) was a Canadian businessman, political activist and organizer, a member of the Order of Canada, and father of the late Nova Scotia New Democratic Party and federal New Democratic Party leader Alexa McDonough.

Life and career
Shaw was born in Annapolis Royal, Nova Scotia, to Lloyd E. Shaw and wife Lillian Morse, owners of L. E. Shaw Ltd, brickmakers. Earning a Master of Arts degree in Economics from Columbia University, Shaw went to teach in the schools throughout the Annapolis Valley. It is suggested that while at Columbia Shaw became interested in socialism, a course which would direct the remainder of his life. Shaw also worked with the YMCA in Halifax and Ottawa.

While in Ottawa Shaw was very important in the founding of Carleton University, becoming the university's first registrar. It is in Ottawa where Shaw met many of the founders of the Co-operative Commonwealth Federation. When the CCF officially formed in 1933 Shaw became the political party's first national research director. In the mid-1940s Shaw and his family returned to Nova Scotia, where he held the position of provincial secretary of the Nova Scotia wing of the CCF until 1949.

During World War II Shaw enlisted in the Royal Canadian Air Force and spent the war as a flight sergeant. It is after the war that Shaw took over the family business as CEO of L.E. Shaw Ltd. He held the position of CEO until 1979 when he retired at the age of 65.

Shaw was involved in many community and business organizations. He held the position of director of the Nova Scotia Savings and Loan Company, member of the executive council of the Canadian Manufacturers' Association and at one point was vice-president of the Atlantic Provinces Economic Council. Shaw also worked tirelessly for community groups including Veterans Against Nuclear Arms and Elderhostel.

Shaw received the degree Member of the Order of Canada in 1993. Throughout his career Shaw was honoured numerous times with honorary degrees from such institutions as Acadia University, Dalhousie University, St. Francis Xavier University and the Nova Scotia Technical College.

Shaw died on October 16 1993 at the age of 79 in Halifax, Nova Scotia after a four-year-long battle with Alzheimer's disease.

Shaw's daughter Alexa McDonough, by his marriage to Jean MacKinnon, followed in her father's political footsteps, becoming the first female leader of the provincial party in 1981 when she became leader of the Nova Scotia New Democratic Party, and leader of the federal party in 1995. Shaw himself ran for the CCF in the 1945 and 1949 federal elections and in a federal byelection in 1948, and for the NDP in the 1974 federal election, but was never elected to the House of Commons of Canada.

Electoral results

References

1914 births
1993 deaths
Businesspeople from Ottawa
Businesspeople from Nova Scotia
Canadian socialists
New Democratic Party candidates for the Canadian House of Commons
Members of the Order of Canada
Co-operative Commonwealth Federation candidates for the Canadian House of Commons
Columbia University alumni
Royal Canadian Air Force personnel
Canadian military personnel of World War II
Academic staff of Carleton University
People from Annapolis County, Nova Scotia